Year 985 (CMLXXXV) was a common year starting on Thursday (link will display the full calendar) of the Julian calendar.

Events 
 By place 

 Europe 
 Summer – Henry II (the Wrangler) is restored as duke of Bavaria by Empress Theophanu and her mother-in-law Adelaide at an Hoftag assembly in Rohr (Thuringia). King Otto III (5-years old) remains under the regency of the two empresses in the Holy Roman Empire and in the Kingdom of Italy.
 Battle of Fýrisvellir: King Eric the Victorious defeats a Swedish Viking army under Styrbjörn the Strong (his nephew) near Uppsala.
 July 6 – The city of Barcelona is sacked by Moorish troops under Al-Mansur, the de facto ruler of Al-Andalus (modern-day Spain).

 England 
 Lady Wulfrun, an Anglo-Saxon noblewoman, is granted land by King Æthelred II (the Unready). She founds Heantune that later becomes the city of Wolverhampton in the West Midlands.

 Asia 
 Raja Raja Chola I (considered by many as the greatest emperor of the Chola Empire) becomes ruler of the Chola Dynasty. During his reign he expands his domains beyond South India.

 By topic 

 Exploration 
 Greenland is colonized by the Icelandic Viking Erik the Red (according to legend, but has been established as approximately correct – see History of Greenland).

 Religion 
 July 20 – Anti-Pope Boniface VII dies under suspicious circumstances at Rome. He is succeeded by John XV as the 137th pope of the Catholic Church.
 Amalfitan Benedictines found the only Latin Christian monastery on Mount Athos with the support of John the Iberian. The monastery will last until 1287.

Births 
 August 13 – Al-Hakim bi-Amr Allah, Fatimid caliph (d. 1021)
 Adalbert, margrave of Austria (approximate date)
 Boniface III, margrave of Tuscany (approximate date)
 Gilbert Buatère, Norman nobleman (approximate date)
 Gisela (or Gizella), queen of Hungary (d. 1065)
 John Gualbert, Italian monk and abbot (d. 1073)
 Hamza ibn 'Ali ibn-Ahmad, founding leader of the Druze
 Maria of Amalfi, Lombard duchess and regent 
 Osmond Drengot, Norman nobleman (approximate date)
 Pilgrim, archbishop of Cologne (approximate date)
 Radbot, German nobleman (approximate date)
 Rodulfus Glaber, French monk and chronicler (d. 1047)
 Theobald II, French nobleman (approximate date)
 Wazo, bishop of Liège (approximate date)
 Zhao Yuanyan, prince of the Song Dynasty (d. 1044)

Deaths 
 January 31 – Ryōgen, Japanese monk and abbot (b. 912)
 June 26 – Ramiro III, king of León (Spain) (b. 961)
 July 20 – Boniface VII, antipope of the Catholic Church
 August 25 – Dietrich of Haldensleben, German margrave
 Basil Lekapenos, Byzantine chief minister (b. 925)
 Chen Hongjin, Chinese warlord and general (b. 914) 
 Herbert III (the Old), Frankish nobleman (b. 910)
 Hywel ap Ieuaf, king of Gwynedd (Wales)
 Judith, duchess regent of Bavaria (b. 925)
 Kishi Joō, Japanese female waka poet (b. 929)
 Marzuban ibn Muhammad, Shaddadid emir
 Muirgus mac Domnaill, king of Uí Maine (Ireland)
 Rikdag, margrave of Meissen (Germany)
 Tornike Eristavi, Georgian general and monk
 Harold II (Bluetooth), king of Denmark and Norway

References